The Kvashnins-Samarins are an ancient Russian noble family.

All members were written as Kvashnin-Samarins up until the 17th century, where some began to be written as Samarin.

This name shares origins with noble families Kvashnins, Samarins, Razladins and Tushins .

Origins and History 
The ancestor of the family, Nester Ryabets, arrived in Moscow (about 1300) from the land of Red Ruthenia, where it is mentioned (1282) among the boyars of the Leo I of Galicia. A squad of 1,700 people came with him. His son Rodion Nestorovich , a boyar under the Grand Duke Ivan Kalita, a famous warrior. Ivan Rodionovich, a famous boyar warrior.

The great-grandson of Ivan Rodionovich Kvashny, Stepan Rodionovich Samara, was the ancestor of the Samarins and Kvashnins-Samarins and is mentioned at the wedding of Princess Sofia Ivanovna, daughter of Ivan III of Russia to Prince Vasily Kholmsky (February 13, 1500).

Coat of Arms 
The shield, which has a golden field, depicts a white one-headed eagle with outstretched wings, which has a golden cross on its chest on a small blue shield, placed on a silver horseshoe facing upwards (Jastrzębiec coat of arms).

The shield is crowned with an ordinary noble helmet with a noble crown on it and three ostrich feathers. The basting on the shield is gold, enclosed in blue. Shield holders: two lions looking to the sides with curled tails. The coat of arms of the Kvashnin-Samarin family is included in Part 2 of the General coat of arms of the noble families of the All-Russian Empire, p. 39

Notable Members 

 Vasily Ivanovich Kvashnin-Samarin - 1st Voivode of the Ertaul regiment in the Kazan campaign (1544).
 Mikhail Ivanovich Kvashnin-Samarin - Voivode of the Guard Regiment in the Polotsk campaign (1551).
 Mikhail, Pyotr Andreevich, Prokofy Vasilievich Kvashnins-Samarin - the stewards of Tsarina Praskovia Saltykova (1692).
 Timofey Vasilievich and Timofey Lukich Kvashnins-Samarin - Moscow noblemen (1692-1694).
 Andrey Nikitich and Prokofy Vasilievich Kvashnins-Samarin  - Pantlers  (1692).
 Pyotr Timofeevich Kvashnin-Samarin - master of arms (1742).
 Fyodor Petrovich Kvashnin-Samarin - Master of Heralds (since 1755), President of the Chief Magistrate in Moscow.
 Pyotr Fedorovich Kvashnin-Samarin - President of the Collegium of Justice under Catherine the Great, and Paul I of Russia - Senator (1786 -1793) - Governor in the Novgorod Viceroyalty.
 Andrey Nikitich Kvashnin-Samarin (1764-1770) - state councilor - governor of Kazan province.
 Alexander Petrovich Kvashnin-Samarin (1732-1816) - lieutenant general (1806), head of the Oryol governorship (1794-1796), 1st Oryol governor (1796-1797).
 Nikolai Nikolaevich Kvashnin-Samarin (1883-1920) - Colonel of the Preobrazhensky Life Guards Regiment , Knight of St. George.
 Nikolai Dmitrievich Kvashnin-Samarin (1841 - not earlier than 1918) - historian, philologist, ethnographer.
 Stepan Dmitrievich Kvashnin-Samarin (1838-1908) - statesman and public figure, member of the State Council, full state councilor.
 Elizaveta Petrovna Kvashnina-Samarina (married to Chernyshev ; 1773-1828) - wife of Count GI Chernyshev, a lady of the Order of Saint Catherine of the Lesser Cross.
 Elizaveta Petrovna Kvashnina-Samarina (married to Rodzianko ; 1794-1877) - head of the Catherine Institute .

References 

Russian noble families